Romani (floruit 1714) was a French adventurer involved in the Affair of the Poisons.

Romani was described as a person credited with great abilities in disguise and persuasion. He was the intended son-in-law of Catherine Monvoisin, who had him engaged to her daughter Marguerite Monvoisin. He did, however, break the engagement after it became known to him that she had been pregnant by another man shortly before their engagement.

He was accused of having conspired with his lover Catherine Monvoisin to assassinate Angélique de Fontanges with poisoned gloves, while he was valet-de-chambre to a lady of the court.  It was further claimed that he planned to assassinate Louis XIV by handing him a petition impregnated with poison. He was pointed out for his participation in this affair by Marguerite Monvoisin, who described him as a poisoner and a master of disguises.

He was sentenced to life imprisonment and sequestration in 1682. The date of his death is not known. He was chained to the wall during his imprisonment, and he is last mentioned in 1714, when one of his fellow prisoners removed his chains out of pity, and was punished for this act.

References
 Anne Somerset - The Affair of the Poisons: Murder, Infanticide, and Satanism at the Court of Louis XIV (St. Martin's Press (October 12, 2003) )
 Jay Robert Nash - Look for the woman: a narrative encyclopedia of female poisoners, kidnappers, thieves, extortionists, terrorists, swindlers, and spies, from Elizabethan times to the present (M. Evans, 1981)
 H Noel Williams - Madame de Montespan and Louis XIV (Wildside Press, 2009)
 Montague Summers -- Geography of Witchcraft (Kessinger Publishing, reprinted 2003)

17th-century births
Year of death unknown
French occultists
Prisoners and detainees of France
French people who died in prison custody
Poisoners
17th-century occultists
Affair of the Poisons